Walter Francis "Buddy" Davis (January 5, 1931 – November 17, 2020) was an American athlete. After winning a gold medal in the high jump at the 1952 Olympics he became a professional basketball player.

The Philadelphia Warriors selected the  Davis in the second round of the 1952 NBA draft. He spent five seasons with the Warriors and St. Louis Hawks, averaging 4.8 points and 4.3 rebounds per game.

Davis was Inducted into the Texas Sports Hall of Fame in 1964 and to the Texas Track and Field Coaches Association Hall of Fame in 2016.

Davis died on November 17, 2020, in Port Arthur, Texas at age 89.

References

1931 births
2020 deaths
American male high jumpers
American men's basketball players
Athletes (track and field) at the 1952 Summer Olympics
Basketball players from Texas
Centers (basketball)
Medalists at the 1952 Summer Olympics
Olympic gold medalists for the United States in track and field
Philadelphia Warriors draft picks
Philadelphia Warriors players
Power forwards (basketball)
Sportspeople from Beaumont, Texas
St. Louis Hawks players
Texas A&M Aggies men's basketball players
Texas A&M Aggies men's track and field athletes
Track and field athletes from Texas
World record setters in athletics (track and field)